Bufton is a small hamlet in England between the Leicestershire villages of Carlton and Barton in the Beans. It has around 10–15 residents, mainly on farms.

Hamlets in Leicestershire
Shackerstone